Saltcoats was a federal electoral district in Saskatchewan, Canada, that was represented in the House of Commons of Canada from 1908 to 1925.

This riding was created in 1907 from parts of Assiniboia East, and Qu'Appelle ridings. It consisted of a part of eastern Saskatchewan north of the Qu'Appelle river. It was abolished in 1924 when it was redistributed into Last Mountain, Melville and Yorkton  ridings.

Election results

See also 

 List of Canadian federal electoral districts
 Past Canadian electoral districts

External links 

Former federal electoral districts of Saskatchewan